Carnival is a live album by American jazz pianist Randy Weston recorded in 1974 at the Montreux Jazz Festival and originally released on the Freedom label in 1975.

Reception

Allmusic awarded the album 4 stars, with its review by Scott Yanow stating, "This is an enjoyable and well-rounded set, easily recommended". Village Voice critic Robert Christgau wrote: "A delightful discovery. Weston applies the rigorous wit of Monk to easy rolling African polyrhythms, and they hold up. The title cut suggests a time when intellect is transcended rather than blotted out and makes Lonnie Liston Smith sound pretty sloppy."

Track listing 
All compositions by Randy Weston except as indicated
 "Carnival" - 12:42   
 Introduction - 1:00   
 "Tribute to Duke Ellington" - 7:25   
 Introduction - 1:00   
 "Mystery of Love" (Guy Warren) - 17:55

Personnel 
Randy Weston - piano
Billy Harper - tenor saxophone, flute 
William Allen - bass
Don Moye - drums
Steve Berrios, congas, percussion

References 

Randy Weston live albums
1975 live albums
Freedom Records live albums
Albums recorded at the Montreux Jazz Festival
Albums produced by Michael Cuscuna